The Journal of Chemical Technology & Biotechnology is a monthly peer-reviewed scientific journal. It was established in 1882 as the Journal of the Society of Chemical Industry by The Society of Chemical Industry (SCI). In 1950 it changed its title to Journal of Applied Chemistry and volume numbering restarted at 1. In 1971 the journal changed its title to Journal of Applied Chemistry and Biotechnology and in 1983 it obtained the current title. It covers chemical and biological technology relevant for economically and environmentally sustainable industrial processes. The journal is published by John Wiley & Sons on behalf of the Society of Chemical Industry.

Abstracting and indexing
The journal is abstracted and indexed in:

According to the Journal Citation Reports, the journal has a 2020 impact factor of 3.174.

References

External links
 

Biotechnology journals
Biotechnology in the United Kingdom
Chemistry journals
English-language journals
Wiley (publisher) academic journals
Monthly journals
Publications established in 1882